Amran El Krenawy (born 21 February 1996) is an Israeli footballer who plays for Kafr Qasim from the Liga Leumit as a winger.

Early life
El Krnawy was born in Rahat, Israel, to a Muslim-Arab family  of Bedouin descent.

Career

Hapoel Bnei Lod
In the 2016–17 season Kafr Qasim loaned El Krenawy to Hapoel Bnei Lod.

Hapoel Acre & Bnei Sakhnin
In the 2017–18 season El Krenawy was loaned to Hapoel Acre. On 2 August 2017, El Krenawy debuted in the football association in a 1–2 win over Hapoel Haifa in the Toto Cup. On 8 August 2017, El Krenawy scored his first goal in Hapoel Acre in a 2–1 win over Bnei Sakhnin in the Toto Cup.

Ashdod
In the 2018–19 season El Krenawy was loaned to Ashdod.

References

External links
 

1996 births
Living people
Israeli footballers
Hapoel Be'er Sheva F.C. players
Hapoel Bnei Lod F.C. players
Hapoel Acre F.C. players
Bnei Sakhnin F.C. players
F.C. Ashdod players
F.C. Kafr Qasim players
F.C. Dimona players
Liga Leumit players
Israeli Premier League players
Footballers from Rahat
Israeli people of Egyptian descent
Association football wingers
Arab-Israeli footballers
Arab citizens of Israel
Bedouin Israelis
Israeli Muslims